Hieracium nudicaule is a North American plant species in the tribe Cichorieae within the family Asteraceae. It grows only in the western United States, primarily in California and Oregon, though with a few populations in Washington and northern Idaho.

One stalk can produce 2-12 flower heads in a flat-topped array. Each head has 20-40 yellow ray flowers but no disc flowers.

References

nudicaule
Flora of the Western United States
Plants described in 1883
Flora without expected TNC conservation status